Wilbert Bernard Roger Pennings (born 23 February 1975 in Alphen aan den Rijn) is a Dutch high jumper. He is a thirteen-time Dutch champion and holds the national indoor and outdoor records.

Pennings became Dutch high jump champion for the first time in 1995, jumping over 2.17 metres. In 1999 he improved the Dutch national outdoor record to 2.30 and finished tenth at the 1999 World Championships. In 2000 he represented the Netherlands in the 2000 Summer Olympics in Sydney, where he did not qualify for the final, jumping over 2.20.

In February 2002 in Siegen, Germany, Wilbert Pennings improved the Dutch national indoor record to 2.31 and became seventh at the 2002 European Indoor Championships, one month later. During the outdoor season he finished thirteenth at the 2002 European Championships.

Due to injuries he was unable to compete in the 2004 Summer Olympics, but finished twelfth at the 2006 European Championships.

Pennings, who is an aerospace engineering graduate, works for the Royal Netherlands Air Force and is a member of the Dutch defence top-sport program.

Competition record

Honours
  Dutch National Championships, high jump, 2007, Amsterdam

References
Bijkerk, T. (2004) Olympisch Oranje. De Vrieseborch

1975 births
Living people
Dutch male high jumpers
Olympic athletes of the Netherlands
Athletes (track and field) at the 2000 Summer Olympics
World Athletics Championships athletes for the Netherlands
Sportspeople from Alphen aan den Rijn
20th-century Dutch people
21st-century Dutch people